The Road to Mandalay can refer to:

 "Mandalay" (poem), of 1890 by Rudyard Kipling, whose chorus begins "On the road to Mandalay"
 "On the Road to Mandalay" (song), a 1907 musical setting by Oley Speaks of the Kipling poem
 The Road to Mandalay, a 1917 novel by Bithia Mary Croker upon which the 1926 film was based
 The Road to Mandalay (1926 film), a 1926 film directed by Tod Browning
 The Road to Mandalay (2016 film), a 2016 film directed by Midi Z
 "Eternity/The Road to Mandalay", a 2000 song by Robbie Williams

See also
 Belmond Road to Mandalay, a river cruiser in Myanmar (Burma) that plies the Ayeyarwady (Irrawaddy) River